SZTE-Szedeák, also known as simply Szedeák, is a professional basketball club from Szeged, Hungary. SZTE is an abbreviation of Szegedi Tudományegyetem, the Hungarian name for the University of Szeged. Since the 2010–11 season, Szedeák competes in top  Nemzeti Bajnokság I/A (NB I/A).

History
In 2002, Szedeák was playing in the NB I/B, the national second tier division. However, after the season, the men's team was forced to withdraw from the league which meant only youth teams remained. In 2006, Péter Kardos took over the management of the club and made the team return to Hungary's second tier league. In 2010, the club promoted to the NB I/A, the national top league. In 2014, Szedeák entered the national championship playoffs for the first time, losing 0–3 to  Szolnoki Olaj. 

In the 2020–21 season, Szedeák finished third in the NB I/A under head coach Srećko Sekulović, the best performance in club history.

In the 2021–22 season, Szedeák entered the qualifying rounds of the FIBA Europe Cup, marking the club's debut in Europe.

Honours
 Nemzeti Bajnokság I/A
Third place: 2020–21

Current players

Season by season

 Cancelled due to the COVID-19 pandemic in Hungary.

European competitions

References

External links

Basketball teams in Hungary
Basketball teams established in 1992
1992 establishments in Hungary